Bella Teresa De Jesus La Rosa De La Rosa is a pageant titleholder, was born in Cagua, Aragua, Venezuela on 1949. She is the Miss Venezuela titleholder for 1970, and was the official representative of Venezuela to the Miss Universe 1970 pageant held in Miami Beach, Florida, United States, on July 11, 1970, when she classified in the Top 15 semifinalists.

References

External links
Miss Venezuela Official Website
Miss Universe Official Website

1950 births
Living people
Miss Universe 1970 contestants
Miss Venezuela winners
People from Aragua